Santa Maria, officially the Municipality of Santa Maria, is a 4th class municipality in the province of Pangasinan, Philippines. According to the 2020 census, it has a population of 34,220 people.

History

Santa Maria was formerly a barrio of the Municipality of Tayug.

Santa Maria was founded on January 10, 1855, and was governed by a Captain until 1863. In 1864 Santa Maria was incorporated into the municipality of Tayug due to Santa Maria's inability to maintain its financial stability. In 1877 the inhabitants of Santa Maria applied for separation, as a distinct municipality, from the municipality of Tayug. The application was granted and Santa Maria, again became a town under the governance of Captain Eugenio Vinluan.

In 1903, the Americans arrived in Santa Maria and their rule began. In 1901 there was an election for the president of Santa Maria. This was during the United States military government of the islands. The President was given a two years term, due to his good administration.

Again, in 1903, Santa Maria was incorporated into the town of Tayug. for financial reasons, as before, but in 1907 a special election was held for the purpose of returning all small municipalities that had incorporated with bigger towns. Don Alejandro Gonzales was then elected president and served until 1910 when he was succeeded by Don Mariano de Guzman who served to 1912. From this date, to the present, the different successions of presidents, alcaldes and mayors had occurred all over the islands.

For many years, during the Spanish Regime, religion was the basis of educating the masses. From time to time missionaries of different orders were sent out to Santa Maria to carry out religious services as required of them. It was during the routine visit of a certain priest from the town of Asingan, which was then the most eastern town of the province of Pangasinan, who had extended his mission farther into the east and came to a village. The village was located on a plain in which the Agno River ran and which with a little effort could be irrigated.  The missionary believed that the village could be developed into a prosperous community. Finding the residents to be hospitable, he chatted with them and, in the course of conversation, he thought of giving the place a name. Since it was the Virgin Mary's Day, he called the people of the village to him and with a simple but impressive solemnity proclaimed this place as Santa Maria on this, the Virgin Mary's day.

In the course of time prominent people improved the locality and transferred the town site from Namagbagan, which is now a barrio of the municipality, to its present site near a clay promontory where it formed an impregnable defense against the yearly erosion of the Agno, thus annexing "De Pila" to the original name and making Santa Maria de Pila its final name, a name which is known beyond the confines of the province of Pangasinan.

The town much progressive due to close proximity to Rosales and Tayug.

Geography

Barangays
Santa Maria is politically subdivided into 23 barangays. These barangays are headed by elected officials: Barangay Captain, Barangay Council, whose members are called Barangay Councilors. All are elected every three years.

Climate

Demographics

Economy

Geography
Santa Maria, belonging to the sixth congressional district of the province of Pangasinan, is governed by a mayor designated as its local chief executive and by a municipal council as its legislative body in accordance with the Local Government Code. The mayor, vice mayor, and the councilors are elected directly by the people through an election which is being held every three years.

Elected officials

Gallery

References

External links

 Santa Maria Profile at PhilAtlas.com
  Municipal Profile at the National Competitiveness Council of the Philippines
 Santa Maria at the Pangasinan Government Website
 Local Governance Performance Management System
 [ Philippine Standard Geographic Code]
 Philippine Census Information
 Official Website of Santa Maria Pangasinan

Municipalities of Pangasinan
Populated places on the Agno River